Local elections were held in Scotland on 6 May 1999, the same day as First Scottish Parliament elections. It was the second election for all 32 Scottish councils and the first after a major review into all wards.

Boundary changes
A Major review of all boundaries took place before the 1999 elections as part of the third comprehensive review by the independent Local Government Boundary Commission for Scotland  which resulted in an overall reduction of wards to 1222 instead of 1245 and many wards were restructured.

NOT a full list: 
 Aberdeen Lost 7 seats
 Aberdeenshire Gained : 
 Argyll & Bute Gained 
 Dumfries & Galloway Lost 
 Falkirk Lost 4 seats:
 Fife lost 12 seats.
 Glasgow lost 4 seats.

Results

|-
!colspan=2|Parties
!Votes
!Votes %
!Wards
!Wards %
!NetGain/Loss
|-
| 
||829,921
||36.6
||550
||45.0 
|| 
|-
| 
||655,299
||28.7
||204
||16.7 
||
|-
| 
||289,236
||12.7
||156
||12.8
||
|-
| 
||308,170
||13.5
||108
||8.8
||
|-
| 
||172,297
||7.5
||191
||16.0
||
|-
| style="width: 10px" bgcolor=|
| style="text-align: left;" scope="row" | Other
||30,342
||1.0
||9
||0.7
||
|-
!colspan=2|Total
! 2,285,345
!n/a
!1222
!n/a
!n/a
|}

 Voter turnout: 59.1%

Councils

See also
 Wayback Machine Detail report into the elections
 Scottish Boundary Commission | he Boundary Commission for Scotland is responsible for reviews of UK Parliament constituencies in Scotland. Review of the Third Statutory Reviews of Electoral Arrangements which took place between 1996 and 1998.
 LGC Elections Centre More details about 1999 elections.
 BBC News | Elections | Locals 99 | | State of the Parties

Notes and references

 
1999
Ele
May 1999 events in the United Kingdom